Awatef Abdel Karim (8 February 1931 - 24 April 2021) was an Egyptian composer of contemporary classical music. Karim was the first Egyptian female composer to formally study music composition. She composed for piano, violin, choir, and orchestra, and also wrote music for children. In 1991, she succeeded Gamal Abdel-Rahim as chairman of the composition and conducting department of the Cairo Conservatoire, serving in that position until 1997. A revised edition of her book, Music Appreciation of Nineteenth Century Music was published in 2005 in Cairo. She was awarded the State Merit Award in June 2006. Her notable students include Ahmed El-Saedi, Ali Osman, and Mohamed Abdelwahab Abdelfattah.

Compositions
Nine Pieces for Children, piano

See also
 List of Egyptian composers
 Music of Egypt

References

External links
AAWM article mentioning Awatef Abdel Karim
International Alliance for Women in Music article mentioning Awatef Abdel Karim

Egyptian composers
Women classical composers
1931 births
2021 deaths
20th-century classical composers
Place of birth missing
Place of death missing
Egyptian women musicians
20th-century Egyptian musicians
21st-century Egyptian musicians
21st-century women musicians
20th-century women composers